Robert Herring Wright (May 21, 1870 – April 25, 1934) was the first president of East Carolina Teachers Training School.

Wright received his Bachelor of Arts degree in 1897 from the University of North Carolina. He completed further education at Johns Hopkins University and Columbia University. He held many teaching posts until he was asked by Thomas Jordan Jarvis to serve as the first president in 1909. By 1920, Wright successfully lobbied the North Carolina state legislature to approve a four-year curriculum, which forced a re-charter and name change to East Carolina Teachers College. The Wright Building on the main campus at ECU is named for him. He died of a heart attack in 1934.

References

External links
 East Carolina University Icons Gallery profile
 Records of Robert Herring Wright's Tenure as President of East Carolina Teachers College, 1907–1934. UA02-01. University Archives, East Carolina University.
 Wright Building History from ECU Archives

1870 births
1934 deaths
People from Sampson County, North Carolina
University of North Carolina at Chapel Hill alumni
Johns Hopkins University alumni
Columbia University alumni
Presidents of East Carolina University
Baltimore City College faculty